Hélène Rousseaux (born 25 September 1991) is a Belgian female volleyball player. She is a member of the Belgium women's national volleyball team and played for LJ Modena in 2014.

She was part of the Belgian national team at the 2014 FIVB Volleyball Women's World Championship in Italy.
Belgian national volleyball player Tomas Rousseaux is her brother.

Clubs
  Vilvoorde (2008-2009)
  Voléro Zürich (2009-2011)
  Budowlani Łódź (2011-2012)
  Muszyna (2012-2013)
  LJ Modena (2013-2015)
  AGIL Novara (2015-2016)
  Busto Arsizio (2016)
  Beşiktaş (2016-2017)
  Rzeszów (2017-)
  Suwon Hyundai Engineering & Construction Hillstate (2020-)

References

External links
http://www.volleywood.net/volleyball-related-news/volleyball-news-europe/belgium-volleyball-news-europe/belgiums-the-yellow-tigers/
http://worldgrandprix.2016.fivb.com/en/group1/competition/teams/bel-belgium/players/helene-rousseaux?id=51502
 
 

1991 births
Living people
Belgian women's volleyball players
Place of birth missing (living people)
Wing spikers
Sportspeople from Brussels
21st-century Belgian women